Public transport in South Korea, which is widely used by people, includes buses, subways, and bicycles. Public transportation means all transportation facilities and means that provide transportation services available to the general public. The range of public transportation, including air, sea, and roads, is wide, and among them are city buses and urban railroads. Along with the rapid growth of Korea, public transportation has also developed to facilitate people's movement.

Background 
After the Industrial Revolution, people began to flock to the city center. Factories began to sprout around the city. People working in factories settled around, and industrial activity increased at a rapid pace. As time went by, people from farther places began to flock. Public transportation such as trams and railways was installed for these people to move quickly. As the industry continued to develop, people gradually left the countryside and came to work in factories. These people naturally settled in close proximity to jobs or near easy-to-move stations. In other words, the city developed along the station. The concentration of population in large cities has continued and more transportation is needed to move these people.

The development of industry and automobile technology in the 1960s led to a growing number of people having own cars, mainly in advanced countries such as Europe. The number of cars has more than doubled in Europe in a decade. People can go anywhere, anytime by car. Even now, the demand for cars continues to grow. Increased demand for cars has also helped ease the population's downtown concentration. This is because you can buy a cheap house in a relatively remote area that was difficult to access by public transportation and travel by car. At first, residential areas were formed in the center of the city, and the size of the city grew as the concentric circle grew from the center. Of course, new roads had to be built and intersections, circular roads and highways had to be built to accommodate the growing number of cars. In other words, transportation systems such as private cars and road expansion have been developed to speed up travel time. The problem of environmental pollution is also a reason why public transportation has developed. The car's fuel is consumed and pollutants such as nitrogen oxides, carbon monoxide, hydrocarbons and dust due to incomplete combustion are also released. By the 1990s, cars also emitted sulfur dioxide.

Bus 

Buses are one of the most popular means of transportation in Korea. Buses began operating in 1912, and were operated first in the provinces. There are also types of buses, including city buses, intercity buses, and express buses. In 2017, the total number of passengers transported in total was 5,968,577,185. Also the bus, which carries 65 people and operates every 10 minutes, has 390 passengers per hour. In the case of bus fares, the amount varies depending on the type of bus and the method of payment, and it also depends on the age. Like the card terminal image on the right, people pay the right fare by placing the transportation card on that machine. Among the various types (mainly classified according to distance traveled), there is a separate application for bus booking. The app has a simple payment function, so if you register only the card you want to pay for, you can make a reservation in just a few minutes if you choose the boarding date and the seat you want. There is also a machine at a bus stop in Korea that allows passengers to check their remaining balance by bringing a transportation card that they want to use. In addition, the arrival time and remaining seats of the buses at the bus stop in question are displayed on the electronic display board, which is very convenient. If you search the desired bus number in the search box in conjunction with the Internet, you can know the arrival time of the bus, bus car number, etc., even if the passenger is not necessarily at the bus stop.

Currently, not all buses in Korea are considerate of the disabled. For them, the number of low-floor buses with low footrest heights has increased compared to the past, but they are still lacking. Of course, in addition to this situation, there are some areas where low-floor buses are not suitable for running on some roads.

In principle, buses in Korea cannot carry food such as beverages. Especially when you ride with food that smells a lot, you get away from etiquette. In a similar vein, drivers can refuse to ride if they get on a bus without a mask as the coronavirus has become so prevalent recently.

Subway 

Korean subways include regular subways, KTX, Mugunghwa-ho and Saemaeul-ho trains. As of 2018, there are 348 stations for regular subways. The biggest advantage of the subway compared to other means of transportation is that it has a large number of people per hour. With 600 people on board, the hourly passenger traffic on the subway, which runs every two minutes, is 18,000 people. Due to this amount of transportation, it is hard to find large cities that do not have subways not only in Korea but also in the world. In Lyon, France, about 10,000 people use the subway per hour. The reason why the subway has a large number of people per hour is because it uses a dedicated railroad. It can run at an average speed of 75 kilometers because there is nothing in the way of driving. During rush hour, when there is a severe congestion, one bus runs every two minutes. However, it takes a lot of time and money to build a subway infrastructure. The subway has to invest three to five times more money than trams because it has to build rails through tunnels and build elevators, stairs and platforms. Construction costs are covered by taxes from local governments, the central government, companies and passengers. The safety of the subway system is almost safe if checked in general without many factors. However, it is not completely safe and requires more caution than other public transportation in terms of derailment, power outage, tunnel collapse and collision. Therefore, the subway has many safety technologies. Recently, screen doors were installed at all stations to prevent the train from crashing into the tracks. Using double track, frontal collisions are extremely rare and reduce the risk of rear-end collisions and derailments by lowering the speed of operation. Fire is prone to occur, and the system provides places for evacuation. However, it is said that it is almost under control.

Bicycle 
In Korea, the number of registered bicycles is about 11,268,816 as of 2016, and the number is increasing. In Korea, there is a record that Seo Jae-pil first introduced it in 1895 after returning from the U.S. in the 1890s and toured the construction site of Independence Gate. At that time, it was called a wheelbarrow, but the government named it Bicycle in the 1903s.

There are many bicycle clubs in Korea, and many people enjoy riding bicycles as a leisure activity. In addition, when other public transportation is crowded, bicycles can travel faster than walking, so office workers often use them when commuting. As the number of bicycle riders increased, almost every part of the country also built bike lanes. Bicycle-only roads are mainly accessible, and are designed to reduce the contact accidents between pedestrians and bicycles. On the other hand, bicycle clubs are beneficial in that they can build a bond between people and live a healthy life. However, there are growing calls for improvement as they are driving on motorways rather than bicycle lanes, and are feared to cause contact accidents between bicycles and cars.

Problems 
The problem of public transportation is that people have to transfer too often. In order to solve this problem, it was necessary to reduce the travel time, or distance, in urban and residential areas as much as possible. Therefore, urban lawmakers are also planning to deploy the existing mega-sized complex centers on a small scale and deploy residential and commercial facilities in various places. Some big cities in developed countries come up with extreme policies to address traffic jams. In London, for example, motorists have to pay to enter central London. Some cities completely restrict the entry of cars from the heart of the city, allowing only pedestrians and bicycles to travel.

Meanwhile, South Korea argues that taxi drivers are included in public transportation even if they do not have regular connections due to the nature of taxis. In fact, some members of the National Assembly of the Republic of Korea proposed a bill to include taxis in the scope of public transportation in 2012, but bus drivers and operators decided to suspend the operation of buses in Korea in protest. In addition, the bill was opposed by the South Korean government and many other places.

Accidents

Bus 
Buses carry more people than cars, so special attention is needed for bus drivers. Drowsy driving is more important than expected among the causes of accidents. There were also various types of accidents, such as hitting a person on the road, sliding on a snow road, and falling below a cliff. Buses are likely to be accompanied by casualties in the event of an accident.

Subway 
There are also constant subway accidents, and the biggest reason is the aging of the subway. In the case of Seoul, it has been operating the Seoul Metro for about 40 years, and it needs to be discussed whether maintenance personnel are properly deployed. Besides aging, there are also traffic errors between subways and lack of safety personnel.

Bicycle 
Bicycles are often caused by collisions between people, cars and bicycles. When unexpected objects pop out, accidents can't be avoided no matter how much they brake. People who have to wear helmets when riding a bike, but those who don't, are not uncommon. There is also a case of riding a bicycle on a motorway, a very dangerous and conceptless behavior.

Others 

 Etiquette: In the case of buses and subways, you should not talk loudly next to you or call loudly with the person because it is a public facility used by many people. Nor should the facilities be soiled that everyone can use them pleasantly. For safety reasons, passengers should board in order and get off in turn. When you take the subway, you have to let the person who gets off first get off and then get on the subway. It is not a duty, but it is better to give your seat when the elderly and the weak board on the bus or subway.
 A man once held a Danso and threatened other passengers on the subway line 7, which people called a "Danso killer." His appearance had high views.
 One man who took the subway on Line 4 is also famous for dancing in front of other passengers.
 There are seats for the elderly and the weak on buses and subways in Korea, and recently, seats for pregnant women have been added.

References 

Public transport in South Korea